Edmond Vanwaes, also Van Waes, (born 8 March 1892, dead 31 May 1944) was a Belgian rower. He competed at the 1912 Summer Olympics in Stockholm with the men's coxed four where they were eliminated in the quarter finals.

References

1892 births
1944 deaths
Belgian male rowers
Olympic rowers of Belgium
Rowers at the 1912 Summer Olympics
European Rowing Championships medalists
People who died in Natzweiler-Struthof concentration camp
Belgian people who died in Nazi concentration camps
20th-century Belgian people